Księżowola  is a settlement in the administrative district of Gmina Tarczyn, within Piaseczno County, Masovian Voivodeship, in east-central Poland.

The settlement has a population of 140.

References

Villages in Piaseczno County